Little Feat is an American rock band formed by lead vocalist and guitarist Lowell George and keyboardist Bill Payne in 1969 in Los Angeles. George disbanded the group because of creative differences shortly before his death in 1979. Surviving members re-formed Little Feat in 1987 and the band has remained active to the present.

Guitarist Jimmy Page stated that Little Feat was his favorite American band in a 1975 Rolling Stone interview.

History

Formative years
Lowell George met Bill Payne when George was a member of Frank Zappa's Mothers of Invention. Payne had auditioned for the Mothers, but had not joined. They formed Little Feat along with former Mothers' bassist Roy Estrada and drummer Richie Hayward from George's previous band, The Factory. Hayward had also been a member of the Fraternity of Man whose claim to fame was the inclusion of their "Don't Bogart That Joint" on the million-selling Easy Rider film soundtrack. The name of the band came from a comment made by Mothers' drummer Jimmy Carl Black about Lowell's "little feet". The spelling of "feat" was an homage to the Beatles.

There are three stories about the genesis of Little Feat. One has it that George showed Zappa his song "Willin'," and that Zappa fired him from the Mothers of Invention, because he felt that George was too talented to merely be a member of his band, and told him he ought to go away and form his own band. The second version has Zappa firing him for playing a 15-minute guitar solo with his amplifier off. The third version says that Zappa fired him because "Willin contains drug references ("weed, whites and wine"). George often introduced the song as the reason he was asked to leave the band. On October 18, 1975 at the Auditorium Theater in Rochester, New York while introducing the song, George commented that he was asked to leave the band for "writing a song about dope". 

In any version, Zappa was instrumental in getting George and his new band a contract with Warner Bros. Records. The eponymous first album delivered to Warner Bros. was recorded mostly in August and September 1970, and was released in January 1971. When it came time to record "Willin'," George had hurt his hand in an accident with a model airplane, so Ry Cooder sat in and played the song's slide part. Lowell's accident is referenced on the cover art of the band's 1998 album Under the Radar. "Willin would be re-recorded with George playing slide for Little Feat's second album Sailin' Shoes, which was also the first Little Feat album to include cover art by Neon Park, who had painted the cover for Zappa's Weasels Ripped My Flesh. Early 1970s hard rock bands such as Grand Funk Railroad and Mountain were popular, but Little Feat never performed hard rock.

Sometime during the recording of the first two albums, the band members along with ex-Mothers of Invention drummer Jimmy Carl Black ("the Indian of the group") backed soul singer Nolan Porter on his first album, No Apologies.

The first two albums received nearly universal critical acclaim, and "Willin became a standard, subsequently popularized by its inclusion on Linda Ronstadt's album Heart Like a Wheel.

Despite good reviews of their sophomore effort, lack of commercial success led to the band splitting up, with Estrada leaving to join Captain Beefheart's Magic Band, although he has given other reasons for quitting the band, such as to get away from the Los Angeles pollution and the L.A. city life.

Classic line-up and change of direction
In 1972 Little Feat reformed, with bassist Kenny Gradney replacing Estrada. The band also added a second guitarist in Paul Barrere, who had known George since they attended Hollywood High School in California, and percussionist Sam Clayton (brother of session singer Merry Clayton and the brother-in-law of the jazz saxophonist Curtis Amy) and as a result the band was expanded from a quartet to a sextet. Both Barrere and Clayton added vocals on many songs, although all the band members provided backing vocals in various tunes.

This new lineup radically altered the band's sound, leaning toward New Orleans funk. The group went on to record Dixie Chicken (1973)—one of the band's most popular albums, which incorporated New Orleans musical influences and styles—as well as Feats Don't Fail Me Now (1974), which was a studio-recorded attempt to capture some of the energy of their live shows. (The name of the latter album pays homage to the Fats Waller song.)

In 1973, Payne, Gradney, Barrere, Clayton and George (incorrectly credited as George Lowell) collaborated with jazz drummer Chico Hamilton on his Stax album Chico the Master, which is a strong showcase for the band's leanings toward funk and R&B. In 1973 Little Feat backed Kathy Dalton on her Amazing  album on the DiscReet label produced by Warner Brothers. 
Due to disappointing sales, the band disbanded a second time in 1973.  Payne joined the Doobie Brothers and Hayward joined Ike Turner. 

They reformed in 1974.
In 1974, Lowell George, along with the Meters and other session musicians, backed Robert Palmer on his Island Records debut solo release Sneakin' Sally Through the Alley which opened with George's "Sailing Shoes." The whole band chipped in on Palmer's 1975 release, Pressure Drop, which contained another George composition, "Trouble."  1976's Some People Can Do What They Like, his third opus, opened with the Bill Payne/Fran Tate composition "One Last Look," and later featured Lowell's "Spanish Moon," although George and Gradney sat this one out. In March 1976, Little Feat served as the backing band on the first side of Akiko Yano's debut studio album , released on the Philips label. The band remained based in Los Angeles due to doing session work on the side in addition to band activities.

The release of The Last Record Album in 1975 signaled another change in the Little Feat sound, with Barrere and Payne developing an interest in jazz-rock. Prior to the recording of The Last Record Album, drummer Richie Hayward had a motorcycle accident and the liner to the LP release of The Last Record Album was decorated with copies of his many hospital bills. Also present was evidence of a late change to the running order of tracks: the lyrics for Barrere's song "Hi Roller" were printed on the sleeve, but scored out, and the words "maybe next time" scrawled over them. Sure enough, "Hi Roller" was the first track on the subsequent album Time Loves a Hero.

George continued to produce the albums, but his songwriting contribution diminished as the group moved into jazz fusion, a style in which he had little interest. In August 1977, Little Feat recorded a live album from gigs at the Rainbow Theatre in London and Lisner Auditorium in Washington, D.C. Waiting for Columbus is considered by many rock music critics to be one of the best live albums of all time, despite the fact that significant portions of George's vocals and slide work were over-dubbed later in the studio. It was released in 1978, by which time it had become apparent that George's interest in the band was waning, as was his health.

Death of George and band breakup
George did some work on what would eventually become Down on the Farm but then declared that Little Feat had disbanded. In an interview with Bill Flanagan (for the book Written in My Soul) conducted eleven days before his death, George made it clear that he felt the demise of Little Feat was due to his having allowed the band to be run democratically, with the result that Payne and, to a lesser extent, Barrere, had a presence as songwriters and in production which was disproportionate to their abilities. George was particularly scathing about Payne's attempts at jazz/fusion, citing an instance when Payne jammed with Weather Report on a TV show and dropped "into one of his 'Day at the Dog Races'. I just got out of there as fast as I could. It was embarrassing". In the same interview, George stated that he planned to reunite Little Feat without Payne and Barrere.

At this time Warner Bros. released George's only solo album, Thanks, I'll Eat It Here, for which he had signed a contract in 1975. The album was mostly a collection of cover versions that George had been working on as a side project for several years and, in his biography, Rock And Roll Doctor, Mark Brend states that George had hinted he only signed the solo contract to obtain funds to finance Little Feat (and Bill Flanagan states in Written in My Soul that George "didn't want his audience to assume a collection of other people's material marked the direction of Lowell George's solo career").

While touring in support of his solo album in June 1979, at the age of 34, George collapsed and died in his hotel room in Arlington, Virginia. An autopsy determined the cause of death was a heart attack.

The surviving members finished and released Down on the Farm before disbanding in 1979. A subsequent retrospective double album compilation of rare outtakes and live tracks, Hoy-Hoy!, was released in 1981. The album is an overview of the history and sound of Little Feat and includes a cover of the Hank Williams song "Lonesome Whistle".

In 1981 and 1982, Barrere, Clayton, Gradney and Hayward performed several shows as "Barrere, Clayton, Gradney and Hayward" along with singer/guitarist Phil Brown.

Barrere then released two solo albums, 1983's On My Own Two Feet (Mirage) and 1984's Real Lies (Atlantic).  Richie Hayward was the drummer on Robert Plant's 1985 funk and new wave flavoured Shaken 'n' Stirred (Es Paranza).  Payne has always been a popular and busy session musician, as well as a songwriter, and during the band's first hiatus performed on a variety of albums by many famous musicians including J. J. Cale, the Doobie Brothers, Emmylou Harris, Pink Floyd, Bob Seger, Linda Ronstadt, Jackson Browne, James Taylor, Bonnie Raitt, and Stevie Nicks.  He was a guest performer on Raitt's Sweet Forgiveness in 1977, which featured his composition "Takin' My Time."

Fuller years (1987–1993)
In 1986, Richie Hayward, Paul Barrere and Bill Payne were invited to play on Blue Slipper, the 1987 debut album by Helen Watson. They subsequently appeared on her second album The Weather Inside. The surviving former members of Little Feat then reformed in 1987 when Barrere, Clayton, Gradney, Hayward and Payne added songwriter/vocalist/guitarist Craig Fuller, formerly from the band Pure Prairie League, and Fred Tackett on guitar, mandolin and trumpet. The band admired Fuller's previous work and were impressed when he toured with them in 1978 as part of the Fuller/Kaz band. They didn't require an audition, having played with him on tour, and thus, the new Little Feat lineup was formed. The initial release by the new lineup, Let It Roll, was a tremendous success and Fuller's presence proved to be a major factor. His strong vocals and songwriting abilities were showcased, co-writing 8 of the 10 songs and handling a large share of lead vocals. The first single, "Hate to Lose Your Lovin'", earned the band their first No. 1 hit on the Mainstream Rock Tracks chart. All Music Guide critic Stephen Erlewine stated " What's surprising about Let It Roll is not just that it works, but that it works smashingly." The LP garnered Feat a certified gold record status on February 14, 1989. On the heels of this success, previous Feat releases experienced a sudden surge in sales. The February 10, 1978 live release Waiting for Columbus went certified platinum on November 8, 1989. Dixie Chicken, originally released on January 25, 1973, went certified gold also on November 8, 1989. The band received more exposure than ever, including an appearance on Saturday Night Live.  Concerts were booked nationally and Little Feat played enthusiastic, sold-out shows.  Barrere, Payne and company were pleased by the audience reaction; not only were they able to put over the Feat classics, but the new music proved to be artistically and commercially successful. While some Little Feat diehards initially had difficulty accepting the band without Lowell George, the success of Little Feat with Fuller could not be disputed. The band made a comeback that introduced a whole new generation to Little Feat and reignited their past, even though their original creative genius (George) was no longer around.

The follow-up album, Representing the Mambo, released in 1990 proved to be the group's last album for Warner Bros., who were uncomfortable with the album's more jazzy leanings. The third and final album by this lineup, Shake Me Up (1991), was released on Morgan Creek as was the soundtrack of the 1992 film White Sands, which contained one song by Little Feat called Quicksand and Lies, but this label folded soon afterwards and Little Feat moved from one label to another until the establishment of Hot Tomato Records in 2002.

In the fall of 1991, Clayton was forced to miss several tour dates due to ill health.

Fuller departed in 1993, stating that touring required too much time away from his family. He went on to join a re-formed Pure Prairie League, who in 2005 released their critically acclaimed All in Good Time, which heavily featured his songwriting, singing and acoustic guitar. Up until leaving PPL again in 2011, he performed about 40 shows yearly with them, as well as occasional shows with Little Feat in addition to performing solo shows.

Murphy years (1993–2009)
Craig Fuller was replaced by Shaun Murphy in September 1993. Shaun had sung on all of the recent Little Feat albums and throughout 1993 she had toured as part of Bob Seger's band with Fred Tackett and Bill Payne.

Shaun's first album with the group was Ain't Had Enough Fun. As well as having material specifically written for her, for increasing fan draw attracted to her hard-edged powerhouse voice, further albums Under the Radar and Chinese Work Songs saw Murphy become an integral part of the group sharing lead vocals and writing with Payne and Barrere. Her rendition of Bob Dylan's "It Takes a Lot to Laugh" was first recorded in studio on Chinese Work Songs, and became a favorite in live appearances with Murphy as lead singer prior to her departure in 2009.  After recording five studio albums and performing over 1,400 concerts with the band, Murphy's position was made redundant, and the group pared down to a six-piece collective entity. Shaun would subsequently form the Shaun Murphy Band, with a specific blues-oriented niche. As of May 2011, Shaun had released two albums and returned to take her place with the Silver Bullet Band in the 2011 tour of Bob Seger, in addition to many scheduled live appearances with the Shaun Murphy Band, one of which was to release a third album and DVD, Live in Detroit.

Hayward illness and death
In August 2009, Richie Hayward announced that he had recently been diagnosed with a severe liver disease and would be unable to work indefinitely. A benefit concert was organized and a website created where fans unable to attend could donate toward his treatment costs. Little Feat announced that their drum technician Gabe Ford would take his place.

Hayward married and was living on Vancouver Island, British Columbia, with his liver cancer in remission as he awaited a transplant. On Sunday, July 11, 2010, Little Feat played at the Vancouver Island Music Festival and Hayward was slated to play just a couple of tunes, but once he sat behind his kit, he finished out the night. Hayward had intended to return to the band in the event of recovery, but he died on August 12, 2010, from pneumonia and complications from lung disease.

2012 and beyond
In June 2012, Little Feat released their first album of new material in nine years, Rooster Rag.

In 2014, the band Leftover Salmon announced that Bill Payne had joined with them as a permanent member. He left them in 2015 to take up a permanent post in The Doobie Brothers' touring band: this restricted his ability to perform longer tours with Little Feat. After this, the full band would perform around 10 dates per year, while Barrere, Tackett, Gradney and Ford would sometimes tour playing Little Feat material as a four-piece called Funky Feat.

In 1994, Paul Barrere had been diagnosed with Hepatitis C and, in 2013, took a leave of absence from touring with Little Feat to combat the disease, and to remain close to his health providers. He later performed a few one-off gigs with Fred Tackett as an acoustic duo and recorded collaborations with longtime friend Roger Cole. In August 2015, it was announced that he was suffering from liver cancer. In 2017 the band was joined for some shows by the Midnight Ramble Horns (Steve Bernstein, Jay Collins, and Erik Lawrence)  who then augmented the band for the 50th Anniversary tour of 2018. They continue to often join the band on selected dates. The band then toured more sporadically during the next four years.  Paul Barrere died on October 26, 2019. Scott Sharrard, who had filled in for Barrere during Little Feat's 50th Anniversary tour, was later brought on board as a full-time band member.

On September 16, 2020, the band released a video rerecording of the 1975 Lowell George song Long Distance Love. The video introduced a new band lineup with Tony Leone known for his work with Levon Helm and Phil Lesh joining on drums in place of Gabe Ford. Levon Helm's daughter Amy guested on backing vocals - she and Leone had previously played together in Ollabelle. A new song, the first in eight years, When All Boats Rise, was released in late October 2020.

Legacy
Some of the prominent musicians and bands to play and record the music of Little Feat include Phish, The Black Crowes, The Byrds, The Bridge, Garth Brooks, Jackson Browne, Bob Dylan, Steve Earle, The Flying Burrito Brothers, Emmylou Harris, Taylor Hicks, Ron Holloway, Keisuke Kuwata, Nicolette Larson, Nazareth, Robert Palmer, The Radiators, Bonnie Raitt, Linda Ronstadt, Seatrain, John Sebastian, Richard Shindell, Carly Simon, Mick Taylor, Van Halen, Joe Walsh, Bob Weir, Phil Lesh, Sam Bush, Coco Montoya, Vince Herman, Inara George, Stephen Bruton, Widespread Panic, Warren Haynes and Gov't Mule, Blackberry Smoke, Jimmy Buffett, Anders Osborne and Gregg Allman.

In 2008, Little Feat reached their 20th anniversary as a once-again active band, and with just one lineup change since 1988. Jimmy Buffett has been an enthusiastic booster of the band for many years and his private record label was partnered with Feat's Hot Tomato Records to produce the CD Join the Band. Released in mid-August 2008, the album features collaborations with Buffett, Dave Matthews, Emmylou Harris, Bob Seger, Béla Fleck, Brooks & Dunn, Chris Robinson (Black Crowes), Vince Gill, Mike Gordon (Phish), and Inara George.

Little Feat's songs "Sailin' Shoes" and "Fat Man in the Bathtub" were featured prominently in the 2010 Edward Norton film Leaves of Grass.

On October 31, 2010, at Boardwalk Hall in Atlantic City, New Jersey the band Phish covered Little Feat's album, Waiting for Columbus, for their annual Halloween show. As a result of this concert and the distribution of its recording, the album gained recognition from a wider audience among younger listeners.

On July 21, 2018, at Peach Fest at Montage Mountain in Scranton, Pennsylvania, the remaining members of Little Feat joined forces with moe., the Turkuaz Horns and the Ramble Band Horns to recreate and pay homage to the band's classic live album Waiting For Columbus.

Musical style

According to Roots Music Magazine, "What most people remark on when it comes to Little Feat is their refusal to adhere to one genre. While rock ‘n’ roll might work as an umbrella term, Little Feat’s sound stretched much deeper and wider." The band's sound in their early albums was rooted in country rock, but they would expand their style "to incorporate the sounds of Laurel Canyon, California and the traditional blues feel of the deep south." According to Rolling Stone, "Little Feat were the archetypal cult band: inspired, turbulent, smart, experimental, deserving – and accident-prone. Their modest ambition was to warp and syncopate mere reality, using stop-start rhythms and slapstick-surreal lyrics. Out of an internal chemistry that led to almost as many breakups as albums, the group invented a zany South-West synthesis, via New Orleans, Memphis, Macon, Houston, Nashville, Tijuana and their native Los Angeles." The band experimented with jam band styles, incorporating influences from soul, folk music and other genres. By the late 1970s, Rolling Stone said that "Keyboardist Bill Payne and guitarist Paul Barrère were writing tunes that tipped the group toward a less distinctive jazz-rock fusion (closer to its prime emulators, the Doobie Brothers)". Americana UK said that Little Feat was "one of the great melting pots of southern music, drawing heavily on country, folk, blues, soul, swamp pop and R&B to create their signature sound", they classified as swamp rock. Jackson Hole Community Radio called Little Feat "one of the most successful and adored Southern rock bands".

Personnel

Members

 Bill Payne – vocals, keyboards (1969–1979, 1987–present)
 Sam Clayton – congas, vocals, percussion (1972–1979, 1987–present)
 Kenny Gradney – bass (1972–1979, 1987–present)
 Fred Tackett – guitar, mandolin, trumpet, vocals (1987–present)
 Scott Sharrard – guitar, vocals (2019–present)
 Tony Leone – drums (2020–present)

Horn section

Jay Collins - horns (2017-present)
Steve Bernstein - trumpet (2017-present)
Erik Lawrence - horns (2017-present)

Past members
 Lowell George – vocals, guitar, harmonica (1969–1979; died 1979)
 Richie Hayward – drums, backing vocals (1969–1979, 1987–2010; died 2010)
 Roy Estrada – bass, backing vocals (1969–1972)
 Paul Barrere – vocals, guitar (1972–1979, 1987–2019; died 2019)
 Craig Fuller – vocals, additional guitar (1987–1993)
 Shaun Murphy – vocals, tambourine (1993–2009)
 Gabe Ford – drums, backing vocals (2010–2020; touring 2009–2010)

Lineups

Timeline

Discography

Little Feat (1971)
Sailin' Shoes (1972)
Dixie Chicken (1973)
Feats Don't Fail Me Now (1974)
The Last Record Album (1975)
Time Loves a Hero (1977)
 Waiting For Columbus (1978)
Down on the Farm (1979)
Let It Roll (1988)
Representing the Mambo (1990)
Shake Me Up (1991)
Ain't Had Enough Fun (1995)
Under the Radar (1998)
Chinese Work Songs (2000)
Kickin' It at the Barn (2003)
Join the Band (2008)
Rooster Rag (2012)

Annual band excursion to Jamaica
Since 2003 Little Feat has organised an annual fans' trip to Jamaica, where the full band plays several shows, often with guests, and various members perform solo and duo sets.

References

Further reading
Fong-Torres, Ben. (2013). Willin': The Story of Little Feat, Da Capo Press.

External links
 
 Little Feat collection on the Internet Archive's live music archive

 
Articles which contain graphical timelines
American southern rock musical groups
Musical groups disestablished in 1979
Musical groups established in 1969
Musical groups from Los Angeles
Musical groups reestablished in 1988
Musical quartets
Sextets
Rounder Records artists
Proper Records artists
Rock music groups from California
Swamp rock groups
Warner Records artists
Zoo Entertainment (record label) artists